John Davis Stuart (April 27, 1901 – May 13, 1970), nicknamed "Stud," was a Major League Baseball pitcher who played for the St. Louis Cardinals from  to  after pitching at Ohio State University. He coached Marshall University basketball and baseball, winning four straight West Virginia Athletic Conference titles for the Herd from 1928–31, and had 11 players named to the All-West Virginia team and one, Johnny Watson, who signed with the Detroit Tigers in 1930. He was 67-21-1 at Marshall baseball. He was 46-29 as the Marshall basketball coach (1927–31), losing the WVIAC title to Glenville State late in his best season, 12-3 in 1929-30. He was an assistant coach for Marshall football from 1927–31, helping the Herd to win WVIAC titles in 1928 and 1931, with Marshall going 27-15-3 during his time on the sidelines for the Herd.

External links

1901 births
1970 deaths
Baseball players from Tennessee
Baseball players from West Virginia
Basketball coaches from Tennessee
Basketball coaches from West Virginia
Huntington Boosters players
Major League Baseball pitchers
Marshall Thundering Herd baseball coaches
Marshall Thundering Herd men's basketball coaches
Marshall Thundering Herd football coaches
Milwaukee Brewers (minor league) players
Oakland Oaks (baseball) players
Ohio State Buckeyes baseball players
People from Clinton, Tennessee
St. Louis Cardinals players
Syracuse Stars (minor league baseball) players